Lindy Vivas was a former volleyball coach.

Education
1975 Graduate Punahou School
1980 Graduate UCLA Degree in kinesiology

Career
1972 Punahou Volleyball team
1979 UCLA Bruins assistant coach
1979 to 1980 Played for the San Jose Diablos in the International Volleyball Association
1980 to 1983 Texas A&M Aggies associate coach
1983 Texas Magic, Professional Volleyball player
1984 to 1987 Head coach of the Washington Huskies
1988 to 1989 Executive Director/Commissioner of Major League Volleyball
1989 Bay Area Real Estate Agent
1990 San Jose State assistant coach
1991 to 2004 Fresno State Head Coach 
1992 USA National "B" team. assistant coach

Vivas served as the head coach of the Fresno State women's volleyball team from 1991 to 2004, becoming the school's all-time winningest coach in that sport in the process.  Vivas today remains the winningest coach in Fresno State women's volleyball history with a 263-167 overall record and .612 overall winning percentage.  In eight of her 14 seasons at Fresno State, her teams won more than 20 games, including 24 wins during the 1997 campaign.  Six times, her teams finished in the top three of the Western Athletic Conference standings, and three times she was named the WAC Coach of the Year.  Vivas lead Fresno State to the school's best single-season winning percentage of .767 during the 2002 season when the Bulldogs finished 23-7 overall.  Three times under her leadership, Fresno State reached the NCAA Tournament (1991, 1998, 2002) and three times (1992, 1994, 1995) the Bulldogs reached the National Invitational Volleyball Championship (NIVC) in Kansas City, Mo.  Three times under Vivas, the Bulldogs reached the American Volleyball Coaches Association Top 25 national poll.  On November 9, 2003, the Bulldogs' home match versus the University of Hawaii drew 4,708 fans—a new school record—shattering the previous mark of 1,982 fans versus UH on Nov. 23, 1996.  That crowd of 4,708 remains the largest home crowd in Fresno State volleyball history through the 2008 season.  On December 6, 2004, Vivas was fired from the Fresno State head coaching position amid Title IX problems. Vivas filed with the U.S. Department of Education Office over alleged gender based discrimination related to the firing and sued the university.  Following a court trial, on July 9, 2007, a jury of her peers agreed unanimously with Vivas, and she was awarded $5.85 million for back pay and expenses.

References

External links

First takes on Dave Shoji against the Kalani High School. 

Punahou School alumni
American volleyball coaches
American women's volleyball players
Living people
Year of birth missing (living people)
University of California, Los Angeles alumni
Washington Huskies women's volleyball coaches
Fresno State Bulldogs women's volleyball coaches
UCLA Bruins women's volleyball coaches
Texas A&M Aggies women's volleyball coaches
San Jose State Spartans coaches
21st-century American women